The 1949 Ukrainian Cup was a football knockout competition conducting by the Football Federation of the Ukrainian SSR and was known as the Ukrainian Cup.

Competition schedule

First elimination round

Second elimination round

Quarterfinals

Semifinals

Final 
The final was held in Kharkiv.

Top goalscorers

See also 
 Soviet Cup
 Ukrainian Cup

Notes

References

External links 
 Information source 

1949
Cup
1949 domestic association football cups